Maushop (sometimes Moshup) is a mythical hero and giant from Wampanoag folklore. He is said to have several companions, including a giant frog and his wife Granny Squannit.

Mythology 
Maushop served as an explanation for geographical locations. According to legend, he came from Cape Cod (Specifically Aquinnah) and lived there from before the Wampanoag. Maushop was so large that his diet consisted mainly of whales. To catch them, he threw boulders into the water to make stepping stones. During a celebration, he emptied his pipe ashes into the ocean, and they became Nantucket.

At one point, a crab bites his toe causing him to stomp around, leaving large footprints in the ground. Moshup's Rock is named after this story, before Christian missionaries renamed it to "Devil's Footprint."

Maushop was seen as a provider for the Wampanoag, teaching them how to hunt and fish. The Wampanoag apparently became too reliant on him, so he left so they would learn how to survive on their own.

References 

Creation myths
Heroes in mythology and legend
Native American giants